Crosshaven railway station was on the Cork, Blackrock and Passage Railway in County Cork, Ireland.

History

The station opened on 16 June 1903.

Passenger services were withdrawn on 12 September 1932.

Routes

Further reading

References

Disused railway stations in County Cork
Railway stations opened in 1903
Railway stations closed in 1932